Peter Smith, CBE (born 15 May 1942) is a retired British diplomat who was the British Ambassador to Madagascar, the British High Commissioner to Lesotho and in his final position was Governor of the Cayman Islands. He held this position from May 1999 until retirement in May 2002.

References

1942 births
Living people
Commanders of the Order of the British Empire
Governors of the Cayman Islands
High Commissioners of the United Kingdom to Lesotho
Ambassadors of the United Kingdom to Madagascar